Jovan Šljivić (born 14 October 2005) is a Serbian footballer currently playing as a forward for Grafičar, on loan from Red Star Belgrade. He was included in The Guardian's "Next Generation" list for 2022.

Career statistics

Club

References

2005 births
Living people
Serbian footballers
Serbia youth international footballers
Association football forwards
Serbian First League players
Red Star Belgrade footballers
RFK Grafičar Beograd players